The National Marathon to Finish Breast Cancer, also known as the Breast Cancer Marathon and the 26.2 with Donna, is an annual marathon sporting event held in Jacksonville Beach, Florida. It was first held on February 17, 2008.

The national breast cancer marathon and half-marathon begins at the Mayo Clinic in Jacksonville heading east on Butler Boulevard, through the beaches of Jacksonville (which includes Jacksonville Beach, Neptune Beach and Atlantic Beach). The course travels across 2.5 miles of sand on the beach before ending at the Mayo Clinic.

Elisha Barno won the race in 2015 with a time of 2:13:19, netting the $10,000 prize. 

The Breast Cancer Marathon is an official Boston Marathon qualifier race and is open to all participants regardless of sex, age or nationality.

External links
The National Marathon to Finish Breast Cancer

Cancer fundraisers
National Marathon to Finish Breast Cancer
Recurring sporting events established in 2008
Track and field in Florida
Breast cancer awareness